The following is a list of organ composers. It lists the more-important composers of music for the pipe organ.

Argentina

Modern 
 Alberto Ginastera

Australia 
 Graeme Koehne
 Christian Helleman
 Ernest Truman

Austria and Germany

Renaissance
 Elias Ammerbach
 Christian Erbach
 Hans Leo Hassler
 Jakob Hassler
 Paul Hofhaimer
 Leonhard Kleber
 Hans Kotter
 Conrad Paumann
 Hieronymus Praetorius
 Arnolt Schlick

Baroque 
 Johann Friedrich Alberti
 Johann Sebastian Bach
 Georg Böhm
 Nicolaus Bruhns
 Arnold Brunckhorst
 Johann Heinrich Buttstett
 Dieterich Buxtehude (born in Denmark)
 Andreas Düben
 Johann Ernst Eberlin
 Daniel Erich
 Johann Caspar Ferdinand Fischer
 Johann Philipp Förtsch
 Johann Jakob Froberger
 Christian Geist
 Georg Friedrich Händel
 Johann Nikolaus Hanff
 Peter Hasse
 Wilhelm Karges
 Johann Caspar Kerll
 Johann Erasmus Kindermann
 Andreas Kneller
 Johann Ludwig Krebs
 Johann Tobias Krebs
 Johann Krieger
 Johann Kuhnau
 Georg Dietrich Leyding
 Vincent Lübeck
 Johann Mattheson
 Georg Muffat
 Gottlieb Muffat
 Franz Xaver Murschhauser
 Johann Pachelbel
 Alessandro Poglietti
 Jacob Praetorius
 Michael Praetorius
 Johann Adam Reincken
 Ferdinand Tobias Richter
 Christian Ritter
 Heinrich Scheidemann
 Gottfried Scheidt
 Samuel Scheidt
 Sebastian Anton Scherer
 Melchior Schildt
 Heinrich Schütz
 Paul Siefert
 Johann Speth
 Johann Staden
 Johann Steffens
 Johann Ulrich Steigleder
 Delphin Strungk
 Franz Tunder
 Nicolaus Vetter
 Johann Gottfried Walther
 Georg Caspar Wecker
 Matthias Weckmann
 Andreas Werckmeister
 Friedrich Wilhelm Zachow

Classical 
 Johann Georg Albrechtsberger
 Carl Philipp Emanuel Bach
 Johann Ernst Eberlin
 Johann Wilhelm Hertel
 Gottfried August Homilius
 Johann Christian Kittel
 Justin Heinrich Knecht
 Wolfgang Amadeus Mozart
 Christian Heinrich Rinck
 Simon Sechter

Romantic 
 Johannes Brahms
 Anton Bruckner
 Immanuel Faisst
 Robert Fuchs
 Heinrich von Herzogenberg
 Adolf Friedrich Hesse
 Sigfrid Karg-Elert
 Theodor Kirchner
 Franz Paul Lachner
 Felix Mendelssohn
 Gustav Merkel
 Wilhelm Middelschulte
 Julius Reubke
 Josef Rheinberger (born in Liechtenstein)
 August Gottfried Ritter
 Franz Schmidt
 Robert Schumann
 Waldemar von Baußnern
 Max Wagenknecht
 Alexander Winterberger
 Philipp Wolfrum

Modern 
 Joseph Ahrens
 Juan Allende-Blin (born in Chile)
 Peter Bares
 Max Baumann
 Jürg Baur
 Johann Nepomuk David
 Hugo Distler
 Max Drischner
 Hans Gál
 Zsolt Gárdonyi (born in Hungary)
 Harald Genzmer
 Hermann Grabner
 Joseph Haas
 Peter Michael Hamel
 Josef Matthias Hauer
 Anton Heiller
 Kurt Hessenberg
 Paul Hindemith
 Karl Höller
 Bertold Hummel
 Werner Jacob
 Mauricio Kagel (born in Argentina)
 Heinrich Kaminski
 Ernst Krenek
 Tilo Medek
 Wolfgang Mitterer
 Ernst Pepping
 Peter Planyavsky
 Günter Raphael
 Max Reger
Mathias Rehfeldt
 Wolfgang Rihm
 Thomas Daniel Schlee
 Dieter Schnebel
 Hermann Schroeder
 Reinhard Schwarz-Schilling
 Johanna Senfter
 Gerhard Stäbler
 Wolfgang Stockmeier
 Gottfried von Einem
 Heinz Wunderlich
 Gerd Zacher
 Ruth Zechlin

Belgium

Baroque 
 Lambert Chaumont
 Peeter Cornet
 Abraham van den Kerckhoven

Classical 
 Josse-François-Joseph Benaut
 Matthias Vanden Gheyn

Romantic 
 César Franck
 Joseph Callaerts
 Jacques-Nicolas Lemmens

Modern 
 Bernard Foccroulle
 Joseph Jongen
 Paul de Maleingreau
 Arthur Meulemans
 Flor Peeters
 Firmin Swinnen

Brazil
Fabio Costa
Alberto Nepomuceno

Canada

Romantic 
 Joseph-Arthur Bernier
 Gustave Gagnon
 Benoit Poirier
 Healey Willan (born in the United Kingdom)

Modern 
 Gerald Bales
 H. Hugh Bancroft
 Denis Bédard
 Raymond Daveluy
 Jacobus Kloppers (born in South Africa)
 Rachel Laurin
 Ernest MacMillan
 Georges-Émile Tanguay

Croatia

Modern 
 Anđelko Klobučar

Czech Republic (Bohemia)

Baroque 
 Bohuslav Matěj Černohorský
 Václav Jan Kopřiva
 Josef Seger
 Jan Zach

Classical 
 František Xaver Brixi
 Karel Blažej Kopřiva
 Jan Křtitel Kuchař

Romantic 
 Josef Klička
 Josef Labor

Modern 
 Petr Eben
 Alois Hába
 Miloslav Kabeláč
 Zdeněk Pololáník
 Luboš Sluka
 Bedřich Antonín Wiedermann

Denmark

Romantic
 Camillo Carlsen
 Niels Gade
 Johan Peter Emilius Hartmann
 Gustav Helsted
 Edgar Henrichsen
 Otto Malling
 Carl Nielsen

Modern
 Bernhard Christensen
 Pelle Gudmundsen-Holmgreen
 Knud Jeppesen
 Leif Kayser
 Rued Langgaard
 Bernhard Lewkovitch
 Frederik Magle
 Per Nørgård
 Ib Nørholm
 Niels Otto Raasted
 Poul Ruders
 Paul Rung-Keller
 Leif Thybo
 Finn Viderø

Estonia

Romantic 
 Rudolf Tobias

Modern 
 Alfred Karindi
 Arvo Pärt
 Peeter Süda

Finland

Romantic 
 Oskar Merikanto

Modern 
 Kalevi Aho
 Paavo Heininen
 Kalevi Kiviniemi
 Joonas Kokkonen
 Taneli Kuusisto
 Erkki Melartin
 Väinö Raitio
 Einojuhani Rautavaara

France

Renaissance
 Pierre Attaingnant
 Jean Titelouze

Baroque (French classical) 
 Louis Archimbaud
 Jacques Boyvin
 Guillaume-Antoine Calvière
 Louis-Nicolas Clérambault
 Gaspard Corrette
 François Couperin
 Louis Couperin
 François d'Agincourt
 Jean-François Dandrieu
 Pierre Dandrieu
 Jean-Henri d'Anglebert
 Louis-Claude Daquin
 Nicolas de Grigny
 Louis-Antoine Dornel
 Pierre Dumage
 Dom George Franck
 Nicolas Gigault
 Jean-Adam Guilain (born in Germany)
 Gilles Jullien
 Mathieu Lanes
 Nicolas Lebègue
 Louis Marchand
 Christophe Moyreau
 Guillaume-Gabriel Nivers
 Charles Piroye
 Charles Racquet
 André Raison
 François Roberday

Late Classical
 Claude-Bénigne Balbastre
 Jacques-Marie Beauvarlet-Charpentier
 Jean-Jacques Beauvarlet-Charpentier
 Alexandre Pierre François Boëly
 Jean-Baptiste Charbonnier
 Michel Corrette
 Armand-Louis Couperin
 Guillaume Lasceux
 Jean-Nicolas Marrigues
 Jean-Baptiste Nôtre
 Louis-Nicolas Séjan
 Nicolas Séjan

Romantic 
 Augustin Barié
 Édouard Batiste
 Erik Satie
 François Benoist
 Émile Bernard
 Léon Boëllmann
 Joseph-Ermend Bonnal
 Joseph Boulnois
 Henri Büsser
 Alexandre Eugène Cellier
 Charles-Alexis Chauvet
 Henri Dallier
 Léonce de Saint-Martin
 Théodore Dubois
 Paul Fauchet
 Félix Fourdrain
 César Franck (born in Belgium)
 Dynam-Victor Fumet
 Eugène Gigout
 Alexandre Guilmant
 Charles Koechlin
 Maurice Le Boucher
 Louis James Alfred Lefébure-Wély
 Henri Letocart
 Clément Loret (born in Belgium)
 Lazare-Auguste Maquaire
 Édouard Mignan
 Henri Mulet
 Henri Nibelle
 Gabriel Pierné
 Albert Renaud
 Marcel Samuel-Rousseau
 Camille Saint-Saëns
 Alphonse Schmitt
 Déodat de Séverac
 Charles-Marie Widor

Modern 
 Albert Alain
 Jehan Alain
 Paul Allix
 Valéry Aubertin
 Dom Paul Benoit, OSB
 Jacques Berthier
 Jean Marie Berveiller
 Joseph Bonnet
 Michel Boulnois
 Pierre Camonin
 Pierre Cochereau
 Jean-Yves Daniel-Lesur
 Jeanne Demessieux
 Marcel Dupré
 Maurice Duruflé
 Rolande Falcinelli
 André Fleury
 Jean-Louis Florentz
 Jean Françaix
 Raphaël Fumet
 Jean-Jacques Grunenwald
 Jean Guillou
 Naji Hakim (born in Lebanon)
 André Jolivet
 Jean Langlais
 Jean-Pierre Leguay
 Gaston Litaize
 Olivier Messiaen
 Guy Morançon
 Thierry Pallesco
 Henriette Puig-Roget
 Eugène Reuchsel
 Jean-Baptiste Robin
 Daniel Roth
 Pierre Pincemaille
 Charles Tournemire
 Louis Vierne
 René Vierne

Hungary

Romantic 
 Franz Liszt

Modern 
 Dezső Antalffy-Zsiross
 Zoltán Gárdonyi
 György Ligeti
 Zsigmond Szathmáry

Israel

Modern 
Josef Tal

Italy

Renaissance 
 Vincenzo Bellavere
 Girolamo Cavazzoni
 Marco Antonio Cavazzoni
 Giovanni de Macque (born in Netherlands)
 Girolamo Diruta
 Giacomo Fogliano
 Andrea Gabrieli
 Giovanni Gabrieli
 Luzzasco Luzzaschi
 Ascanio Mayone
 Claudio Merulo
 Annibale Padovano
 Girolamo Parabosco
 Rocco Rodio
 Giulio Segni
 Antonio Valente
 Claudio Veggio
 Adrian Willaert (born in what is now Belgium)

Baroque 
 Girolamo Frescobaldi
 Gaetano Greco
 Tarquinio Merula
 Pietro Domenico Paradisi
 Bernardo Pasquini
 Michelangelo Rossi
 Giovanni Salvatore
 Alessandro Scarlatti
 Domenico Scarlatti
 Bernardo Storace
 Giovanni Maria Trabaci
 Domenico Zipoli

Classical 
 Padre Davide da Bergamo
 Domenico Cimarosa
 Fedele Fenaroli
 Baldassarre Galuppi
 Giacomo Insanguine
 Niccolò Jommelli
 Giovanni Battista Martini
 Antonio Salieri
 Giuseppe Sarti

Romantic 
 Giulio Bas
 Marco Enrico Bossi
 Filippo Capocci
 Giovanni Morandi
 Oreste Ravanello
 Giovanni Tebaldini

Modern 
 Mario Castelnuovo-Tedesco
 Roberto Carnevale

Japan 
 Shigeru Kan-no

Lithuania 
 Mikalojus Konstantinas Čiurlionis
 Juozas Naujalis

Latvia 
 Aivars Kalējs
 Pēteris Vasks

Mexico 
 Miguel Bernal Jiménez
 Alfonso de Elías 
 Mario Lavista

Netherlands

Renaissance 
 Hendrik Speuy
 Jan Pieterszoon Sweelinck

Baroque 
 Gisbert Steenwick
 Anthoni van Noordt

Romantic 
 Johannes Gijsbertus Bastiaans
 Richard Hol
 Samuel de Lange Jr.
 Edouard Silas
 Jan Albert van Eijken
 Johan Wagenaar

Modern 
 Hendrik Andriessen
 Henk Badings
 Ton de Leeuw
 Piet Kee
 Daan Manneke
 Fred Momotenko
 Jan Mul
 Herman Strategier
 Simeon ten Holt
 Jan Vriend
 Ad Wammes

Norway

Romantic 
 Johannes Haarklou
 Peter Brynie Lindeman

Modern 
 Magnar Åm
 Egil Hovland
 Kjell Mørk Karlsen
 Trond Kverno
 Knut Nystedt
 Arild Sandvold

Poland

Renaissance 
 Nicolaus Cracoviensis
 Jan of Lublin

Baroque 
 Adam of Wągrowiec

Classical 
 Karol Kurpiński

Romantic 
 Konstanty Gorski
 August Freyer
 Stanisław Moniuszko
 Feliks Nowowiejski
 Władysław Żeleński

Modern 
 Grażyna Bacewicz
 Augustyn Bloch
 Karol Hławiczka
 Jan Adam Maklakiewicz
 Marian Sawa
 Bolesław Szabelski
 Aleksander Szeligowski
 Alexandre Tansman
 Elżbieta Sikora
 Paweł Łukaszewski
 Zygmunt Krauze

Portugal

Renaissance 
 António Carreira
 Manuel Rodrigues Coelho

Baroque 
 Carlos Seixas

Classicism 
 João de Sousa Carvalho

Modern 
 Luís de Freitas Branco

Romania

Modern 
 Christian Wilhelm Berger

Russia

Romantic 
 Alexander Glazunov
 Alexander Goedicke

Modern 
 Fred Momotenko (Russian-Dutch composer)
 Mikael Tariverdiev (born in Georgia)
 Valeri Kikta

Slovakia

Romantic 
 Ján Levoslav Bella
Mikuláš Schneider-Trnavský
Franz Schmidt (active in Austria)

Modern 
Viliam Figuš-Bystrý
Alexander Moyzes
Juraj Beneš
Ilja Zeljenka
Peter Machajdik
Marián Varga

South Africa

Modern 
Stefans Grové

Spain

Renaissance 
 Francisco Correa de Arauxo
 Antonio de Cabezón
 Sebastian Aguilera de Heredia
 Tomás de Santa María

Baroque 
 Pablo Bruna
 Juan Cabanilles
 Antonio Martín y Coll
 José Ximénez

Classical 
 Pedro Carrera y Lanchares
 José Lidón
 Antonio Soler

Romantic 
 Eduardo Torres

Modern 
 Jesús Guridi

Sweden

Romantic
 Elfrida Andrée
 Gustaf Hägg
 Oskar Lindberg
 Otto Olsson
 Emil Sjögren

Modern
Olle Elgenmark
Hans-Ola Ericsson
 Bengt Hambraeus
 Torsten Nilsson
 Hilding Rosenberg
 Fredrik Sixten
 Erland von Koch

Switzerland

Renaissance 
 Fridolin Sicher

Modern 
 Alfred Baum
 Conrad Beck
 Ernest Bloch
 Guy Bovet
 Adolf Brunner
 Willy Burkhard
 Bernard Reichel
 Lionel Rogg
 Carl Rütti

United Kingdom

Renaissance 
 William Byrd
 Orlando Gibbons
 William Inglot
 John Lugge
 John Redford
 Thomas Tallis
 Thomas Tomkins

Baroque 
 John Blow
 Jeremiah Clarke
 William Croft
 Henry Purcell

Classical 
 William Boyce
 Benjamin Cooke
 John Stanley

Romantic 
 Walter Galpin Alcock
 Edward Bairstow
 Herbert Brewer
 E. T. Cook
 Edward Elgar
 Basil Harwood
 Gustav Holst
 John Ireland
 Hubert Parry
 Ronald Richardson Potter
 John Stainer
 Charles Villiers Stanford (born in Ireland)
 William Litton Viner
 Samuel Sebastian Wesley
 William Wolstenholme
 Charles Wood

Modern 
Lennox Berkeley
 Jonathan Bielby
 Judith Bingham
 Hugh Blair  
 Frank Bridge
 David Briggs
 James Francis Brown
 Lawrence Crane
 Harold Darke
 David Gwerfyl Davies
 Peter Maxwell Davies
 Peter Dickinson
 James Douglas
 George Dyson
 Michael Finnissy
 Graham Fitkin
 Percy Fletcher
 Sebastian Forbes 
 Peter Fribbins
 Patrick Gowers
 Thomas Vernon Griffiths 
 William Henry Harris
 Derek Healey
 Alfred Hollins
 Herbert Howells
 Peter Hurford
 Francis Jackson
 Gabriel Jackson
 Craig Sellar Lang (born in New Zealand)
 Kenneth Leighton
 William Mathias
 Peter McGarr
 Herbert Murrill
 Harrison Oxley 
 Ian Parrott 
 Paul Patterson
 Francis Pott
 Simon Preston
 Alan Ridout
 Martin Shaw 
 Kaikhosru Shapurji Sorabji
 Christopher Steel
 Herbert Sumsion
 George Thalben-Ball (born in Australia)
 Eric Thiman
 Ralph Vaughan Williams
 Percy Whitlock
 Malcolm Williamson (born in Australia)
 Arthur Wills

Ukraine

Modern 
 Mykola Kolessa

United States

Romantic 
 Dudley Buck
 George Whitefield Chadwick
 Arthur Foote
 Charles Ives
 John Knowles Paine
 Horatio Parker
 Fela Sowande
 Frank Speller
 Whitney Eugene Thayer

Modern 
 Samuel Adler
 Miguel del Aguila
 William Albright
 George C. Baker
 Samuel Barber
 Edward Shippen Barnes
 Herman Berlinski
 Seth Bingham
 Roberta Bitgood
 William Bolcom
 John Cage
 Clay Christiansen
 Joseph W. Clokey
 Carson Cooman
David Conte
 David Dahl
 Emma Lou Diemer
 Robert Elmore
 Isadore Freed
 Philip Glass
 Calvin Hampton
 David N. Johnson
 Paul Manz
 Charlemagne Palestine
 Stephen Paulus
 Vincent Persichetti
 Daniel Pinkham
 Robert Powell
 Richard Purvis
 Steve Reich
 Terry Riley
 Ned Rorem
 John Serry Sr.
 Leo Sowerby
 Giles Swayne
 Virgil Thomson
 Gwyneth Walker
 Dale Wood
 Charles Wuorinen
 Pietro Yon (born in Italy)
 Richard Zarou

See also
 Organ repertoire
 Organ (music)
 List of Anglican church composers

Sources 
 A Directory of Composers for Organ by Dr. John Henderson, Hon. Librarian to the Royal School of Church Music, 2005, 3rd edition. 
 Eleanor Selfridge-Field, Venetian Instrumental Music, from Gabrieli to Vivaldi. New York, Dover Publications, 1994. 
 Christopher S. Anderson (Ed.), Twentieth-Century Organ Music. New York, Routledge, 2012, 

Organ
Organs (music)